The Wapsie Valley School District, or Wapsie Valley Schools, is a public school district serving the towns of Fairbank and Readlyn and surrounding rural areas in eastern Buchanan County and western Black Hawk County. The school's mascot is the Warriors, and their colors are black and gold.

Schools
The district operates seven schools:
Fairbank Elementary School, Fairbank
Readlyn Elementary School, Readlyn
Wapsie Valley High School, rural, between Fairbank and Readlyn

Four rural elementary schools serving the Amish Community: 
Rural Elementary School #1
Rural Elementary School #2
Rural Elementary School #3
Rural Elementary School #4

See also
List of school districts in Iowa

References

External links
 Wapsie Valley Community School District

Education in Black Hawk County, Iowa
Education in Buchanan County, Iowa
School districts in Iowa